Marcin II Szyszkowski of Clan Ostoja (1554 – 30 April 1630) was a notable Polish priest who attended the Jesuit school of Kalisz and became bishop of Lutsk, Płock and finally of Kraków. In the power of the Bishop of Kraków, he also became Prince of Siewierz.

Life and education 

Szyszkowski was born into a noble family which was part of the Clan of Ostoja. After finishing Jesuit school, he furthermore studied in Krakow, Rome, Bologna and Padova. His great intellect and humanistic view helped him advance quickly. He became chancellor of Piotr Myszkowski, who was bishop of Krakow at the time, and he quickly advanced to the office of Bishop of Luck in 1604, the holy Catholic capital in the area named Christopolis.

On 18 November 1607 he became the Bishop of Płock . He translated a lot of work from Italian to Latin, and founded a Jesuit school in Płock in the year 1616. He finished the building of the Bishop Palace and in Pultusk; he also rebuilt the town castle, and opened a college for poor students.

Szyszkowki moved to Krakow in October 1616 and became Bishop of Krakow on 3 June 1617. During his time as the Bishop of Krakow he opened several schools, churches, and chapels for the Franciscan friars. He was against the reforms and in his battle to preserve the Catholic Church he regained 37 churches for the cause. In the cathedral on Wawel in Krakow, present confession is in the form of a domed canopy made of black and rose marble, gilt-bronze and wood, which was created in the years 1626-1629 on Bishop Marcin Szyszkowski’s foundation.

The most popular sarcophaguses in the 17th century were in the form of busts of the deceased persons, in a style taking its origins from Rome. Four Baroque statues of the bishops of Cracow including Marcin Szyszkowski (made of black marble by Jan Trevano) were placed around St Stanislaus’ confession standing over the crypt in which the bishops are buried.

See also 
 Clan of Ostoja
 Ostoja coat of arms
 Mikołaj Szyszkowski

Sources 

 Nowowiejski A. J., Płock. Monografia historyczna...., Płock 1990
 Piotr Nitecki, Biskupi Kościoła w Polsce w latach 965 - 1999, Warszawa 2000.
 Krzysztof Rafał Prokop: Sylwetki biskupów łuckich. Biały Dunajec: Ostróg : "Wołanie z Wołynia", 2001. .

1554 births
1630 deaths
Clan of Ostoja
Polish nobility
17th-century Roman Catholic bishops in the Polish–Lithuanian Commonwealth
Bishops of Płock
Bishops of Kraków